Moringua macrochir, the longfin spaghetti eel, is an eel in the family Moringuidae (spaghetti/worm eels). It was described by Pieter Bleeker in 1855. It is a tropical, marine and freshwater eel which is known from Batu Island, Indonesia, and Christmas Island, in the eastern Indian Ocean.

References

Moringuidae
Fish described in 1855